Coleophora acanthyllidis is a moth of the family Coleophoridae. It is found in Algeria and Tunisia.

References

acanthyllidis
Moths described in 1907
Moths of Africa